The Adelaide Lightning is  an Australian professional women's basketball team competing in the Women's National Basketball League (WNBL). The club is based in the city of Adelaide, South Australia. The club was formed in 1993 and they play in the 8,000-seat Titanium Security Arena.

History
The Adelaide Lightning were formed in 1993 and started playing out of the Clipsal Powerhouse. Since the early 2000s the team has tended to alternate between their current home at the Adelaide Arena (formerly the Powerhouse) and the Wayville Sports Centre located within the Adelaide Showgrounds.

The Lightning have won the WNBL Championship five times (1994, 1995, 1996, 1998 and 2008). The club's captain during its glory years of the 1990s was three time Olympian, twice WNBL MVP and club games record holder (304) Rachael Sporn. Sporn is also the only Lightning player to have her number (14) retired by the club. Other Opals to have played with the Lightning include Jenny Whittle, Carla Boyd, Jo Hill, Kristi Harrower, Erin Phillips, Jae Kingi-Cross, Marina Moffa, Tracey Beatty and Suzy Batkovic-Brown.

As of the 2013–14 WNBL season, the Lightning and Adelaide's men's NBL team the Adelaide 36ers entered into a merger which saw the two teams share the same management team. This also saw the Lightning move their home games exclusively played at the Adelaide Arena where they would play a number of double headers with the 36ers, ensuring larger home attendances for the Lightning and raising the profile of the team. The return to the 8,000 seat Adelaide Arena gives the Lightning easily the largest current venue in the WNBL (the Arena seats some 2,800 more than the AIS Arena in Canberra, while most other WNBL venues can seat around 2,000 - 2,500).

On 5 March 2019, Mr Bruce Spangler, Chairman of Arena Stadium Management announced that he and another business person had negotiated with the WNBL to take over the licence from Adelaide Basketball who were going to hand in the WNBL Club licence at the end of the 2018-19 season. A new sustainable model has now been released for the public to be involved in.

Season-by-season records

Source: Adelaide Lightning

Statistics

Players

Current roster

Honour roll

References

External links
 Official team website

 
Basketball clubs in Adelaide
Women's National Basketball League teams
Basketball teams established in 1993
1993 establishments in Australia
Sporting clubs in Adelaide